The Rafflesiaceae are a family of rare parasitic plants comprising 36 species in 3 genera found in the tropical forests of east and southeast Asia, including Rafflesia arnoldii, which has the largest flowers of all plants. The plants are endoparasites of vines in the genus Tetrastigma (Vitaceae) and lack stems, leaves, roots, and any photosynthetic tissue. They rely entirely on their host plants for both water and nutrients, and only then emerge as flowers from the roots or lower stems of the host plants.

Description

Flowers 
Rafflesiaceae flowers mimic rotting carcasses in scent, color, and texture to attract their pollinators, carrion flies. For this reason, some flowers of the family Rafflesia are nicknamed "corpse flowers". Most members of Rafflesiaceae possess a large, bowl-shaped floral chamber formed by a perianth tube and a diaphragm. This diaphragm is the opening for carrion fly pollinators and is surrounded by attractive sterile organs. Flowers are generally unisexual, and can range from tens of cm to over a meter large.

Taxonomy
Past taxonomic works have varied as to the classification of Rafflesiaceae. The classification of Rafflesiaceae has been somewhat problematic due to their highly reduced vegetative parts, modified reproductive structures, and anomalous molecular evolution (Davis 2008). Rafflesiaceae lacks rbcL and other plastid genes commonly used for phylogenetic inference in green plants. In fact, Molina et al. (2014) found that a genus of Rafflesia is the first parasitic plant studied containing no recognizable remnants of the chloroplast genome.

Most traditional classifications that were based entirely on morphological features considered Rafflesiaceae sensu lato (in the broad sense) to include nine genera, but the heterogeneity among these genera caused early workers, such as Harms (1935), to recognize four distinct groups that were then classified as tribes (still within Rafflesiaceae). This tribal system was followed by Takhtajan et al. (1985).

The first molecular phylogenetic study (using DNA sequences) that showed two of these tribes were not related was by Barkman et al. (2004).  This study showed three genera (corresponding to tribe Rafflesieae, that is, Rafflesia, Rhizanthes, and Sapria) were components of the eudicot order Malpighiales.  The genus Mitrastemon (tribe Mitrastemoneae) was shown to be unrelated and a member of the order Ericales.  Later that year, Nickrent et al. (2004), using additional molecular data, confirmed the placements by Barkman et al. (2004) and also examined the positions of the two other tribes, Cytineae (Bdallophyton and Cytinus) and Apodantheae (Apodanthes, Berlinianche, and Pilostyles). Nickrent et al. (2004) showed Cytineae was related to Malvales and Apodantheae to either Malvales or Cucurbitales. Apodantheae has since been confirmed to be in the Cucurbitales (Filipowicz and Renner 2010).

Thus, the group traditionally classified as a single family, Rafflesiaceae, was actually composed of at least four distinct and very distantly related clades, with their similarities due to convergent evolution under their common parasitic lifestyle. A goal of taxonomy is to classify together only plants that all share a common ancestor, i.e., are monophyletic. Thus, the original Rafflesiaceae sensu lato is currently split into four families:
 Rafflesiaceae (sensu stricto): Rafflesia, Rhizanthes, Sapria — order Malpighiales
 Mitrastemonaceae: Mitrastemon — order Ericales
 Cytinaceae: Bdallophyton, Cytinus — order Malvales
 Apodanthaceae: Apodanthes, Berlinianche, Pilostyles — order Cucurbitales

These four families can be easily distinguished by floral and inflorescence features:
 Rafflesiaceae: inferior ovary, large flowers occurring singly
 Mitrastemonaceae: superior ovary, flowers occurring singly
 Cytinaceae: inferior ovary, flowers in inflorescences
 Apodanthaceae: inferior ovary, small flowers occurring singly (but arising in clusters from host bark)

Phylogenetic analysis 
Early work on higher-level relationships was able to place Rafflesiaceae (in the strict sense) within the order Malpighiales, but was not able to resolve the closest ancestor within the order. A 2007 phylogenetic analysis found strong support for Rafflesiaceae being derived from within Euphorbiaceae as traditionally circumscribed, which was surprising as members of that family typically have very small flowers. According to this analysis, the rate of flower size evolution was more or less constant throughout the family, except at the origin of Rafflesiaceae – a period of about 46 million years between when the group split from the Euphorbiaceae sensu stricto, and when the existing Rafflesiaceae split from each other – where the flowers rapidly evolved to become much larger before reverting to the slower rate of change.

To maintain monophyletic families, in 2016 the APG IV system separated the family Peraceae from the Euphorbiaceae. A summary cladogram is shown below, with family placements in the APG IV system.

A more recent study has been provided by Liming Cai et al. (2021)

Horizontal gene transfer 
A number of mitochondrial genes in the Rafflesiaceae appear to have come from their hosts (Tetrastigma). Because the hosts are not closely related to the parasites (as shown by molecular phylogeny results for other parts of the genome), this is believed to be the result of horizontal gene transfer. Especially high rates of HGT have been found to take place in Rafflesiaceae mitochondrial genes when compared to nuclear genes and to HGT in autotrophic plants.

References

Sources
Barkman, T.J., S.-H. Lim, K. Mat Salleh and J. Nais. 2004. Mitochondrial DNA sequences reveal the photosynthetic relatives of Rafflesia, the world's largest flower. Proceedings of the National Academy of Sciences of USA 101:787–792.
 Charles C. Davis,  Maribeth Latvis,  Daniel L. Nickrent,  Kenneth J. Wurdack,  David A. Baum. 2007. Floral gigantism in Rafflesiaceae. Science Express, published online January 11, 2007 (online abstract here).
 Filipowicz, N. and Renner, S.S., 2010. The worldwide holoparasitic Apodanthaceae confidently placed in the Cucurbitales by nuclear and mitochondrial gene trees. BMC Evolutionary Biology, 10: p. 219.
Meijer, W. 1997. Rafflesiaceae, in Flora Malesiana I, 13: 1–42.
Molina, J., Hazzouri, K.M., Nickrent, D., Geisler, M., Meyer, R.S., Pentony, M.M., Flowers, J.M., Pelser, P., Barcelona, J., Inovejas, S.A. and Uy, I., 2014. Possible loss of the chloroplast genome in the parasitic flowering plant Rafflesia lagascae (Rafflesiaceae). Molecular biology and evolution, 31: 793-803.
Nickrent, D.L., A. Blarer, Y.-L. Qiu, R. Vidal-Russell and F.E. Anderson. 2004. Phylogenetic inference in Rafflesiales: the influence of rate heterogeneity and horizontal gene transfer. BMC Evolutionary Biology 4:40 (HTML abstract PDF fulltext).

External links

Rafflesiaceae at Angiosperm Phylogeny Web
Parasitic Plant Connection: Rafflesiaceae
BBC news : Family found for gigantic flowers

 
Malpighiales families
Endoparasites